Samia Qureshi is a Pakistan actress. She is known for her roles in dramas Amanat, Bandhay Aik Dor Say, Nand, Deewar-e-Shab and Ishq Hai.

Early life
Saima was born in 1978 on 8 November in Karachi, Pakistan. She completed her studies from University of Karachi. Saima's mother Rozina Qureshi was a film actress and her father Riffat Qureshi was a sound specialist of movies.

Career
Saima made her debut as an actress on PTV in 1990s. She was noted for her roles in dramas Harjaee, Chahatein, Tujh Pe Qurban, Mann Ka Bhanwar, Talluq and Dil Ki Dehleez Par. Then she also appeared in dramas Jithani, Khushboo Ka Ghar, Tootay Huway Taray, Cheekh, Deewar-e-Shab and Choti Choti Batain. Since then she appeared in dramas Resham Gali Ki Husna, Nand, Bandhay Aik Dor Say, Ek Jhoota Lafz Mohabbat, Ishq Hai and Amanat.

Personal life
Saima is married and actor Daniyal Khan is her son. Saima's aunt Afshan Qureshi is an actress and her uncle Abid Qureshi was an actor and her cousin Faysal Quraishi is also an actor.

Filmography

Television

Telefilm

Film

References

External links
 
 

1978 births
Living people
20th-century Pakistani actresses
Pakistani television actresses
21st-century Pakistani actresses
Actresses in Urdu cinema
Pakistani film actresses